JSC Izhavia is an airline based in Izhevsk, Udmurtia, Russia. It is the national airline of the Udmurt Republic of Russia and operates domestic charter and scheduled passenger services. Its main base is Izhevsk Airport.

History 
The airline was formed in 1992 from the Aeroflot Izhevsk Division and was originally known as Izhevsk Air Enterprise.

Destinations 
, Izhavia flew to the following destinations as part of its scheduled services:

Fleet 

As of February 2022, the Izhavia fleet included the following aircraft:

Retired
The airline previously operated the following equipment:
Antonov An-24B
Antonov An-26
Antonov An-26B
Tupolev Tu-134A

References

External links 

Airlines of Russia
Former Aeroflot divisions
Airlines established in 1992
Companies based in Udmurtia